Buenos Aires is a municipality in the Rivas department of Nicaragua, located on the western shore of Lake Nicaragua.

Municipalities of the Rivas Department